The Samsung Hub, formerly 3 Church Street, is a  skyscraper located in the central business district of Singapore. Located at 3 Church Street, it is situated just next to the Prudential Tower. It is a 30-storey office building development, which includes a 6-storey podium block on a  plot of land. The development is a freehold Grade A office tower.

History 
Samsung Hub was completed in 2005. Firms involved in the development included Chinese Chamber Realty Private Limited, Church Street Properties Private Limited, China Square Holdings Private Limited, CapitaLand Limited, and Samsung Corporation. It was formerly owned by CapitaLand, but the company soon sold the development to Ho Bee Group.

The space in Samsung Hub is owned by the Singapore Chinese Chamber of Commerce and Industry, its subsidiary, the Chinese Chamber Realty, and OCBC Bank.

In 2007, CapitaLand announced that it was selling its stake in Samsung Hub to the Ho Bee Group for over $140 million. This works out to almost $1,400 per square foot, based on the net lettable area of about  involved in the transaction. The space owned by CapitaLand comprises the lowest stack of office floors in the building - from the eighth to 15th floors (the first to seventh floors are used for car parking).

Architecture 
AWP Pte Ltd were the Architects of the building. Due to its recent completion in 2005, the building exhibits a post-modern style of architecture, and is built mainly of glass and steel.

Usage of quality building materials, such as the heat-strengthened, double-glazed and turquoise-tinted glass was applied during its construction. The light, elegant structure and luminous curtain wall system creates a modern distinct and deliberate contrast with its monolithic neighbours of glass and granite.

Tilting incident 
In August 2002, a tilt on the building was detected by Samsung Corporation.  The building sank 3 mm to 39 mm to one side between August and November 2002.

After discovering the tilt, Samsung immediately initiated rectification efforts. Micropiles were injected to redistribute the weight of the building and to correct the tilt. Owners of neighbouring buildings reassured tenants that their buildings were structurally sound, free from such problems, having been certified by the authorities as fit for occupation.

It took a total of 2 years for the rectification work to be completed.  Losses due to the construction delay were ameliorated by an agreement between the companies involved, ceding Samsung a portion of the space in the 30-storey tower. Samsung also made "improvements" to the building's facade.

See also 
 List of tallest buildings in Singapore
 Raffles Place

References 

Buildings and structures completed in 2005
Raffles Place
Skyscraper office buildings in Singapore
Downtown Core (Singapore)
Samsung